Oesterdeichstrich is a municipality belonging to the Amt ("collective municipality") Büsum-Wesselburen in the district Dithmarschen in Schleswig-Holstein, Germany.

Oesterdeichstrich is a rural area situated directly east of the dike that connected Büsum with the mainland in 1585, hence its name (Oester/Ost = east, Deich = dike). This municipality includes the airport Heide-Büsum from where the airline Ostfriesische Lufttransport GmbH serves a flight connection to Helgoland.

References

Dithmarschen